Nikolayevka is a rural locality (a selo) in Burnovsky Selsoviet, Birsky District, Bashkortostan, Russia. The population was 505 as of 2010. There are 7 streets.

Geography 
Nikolayevka is located 9 km southeast of Birsk (the district's administrative centre) by road. Birsk is the nearest rural locality.

References 

Rural localities in Birsky District